Jacob Snapps Oboreh is a Nigerian Professor of Operations Research and Management who was a former Rector of Delta State Polytechnic, Ozoro and the Pioneer Vice Chancellor of Delta State University of Science and Technology, Ozoro.

He was the Rector of Delta State Polytechnic, Ozoro from 2012 until his tenure expired in 2017.

Career 
On 26 April 2021,  Oboreh was appointed the pioneer Vice Chancellor of Delta State University of Science and Technology, Ozoro by Governor Ifeanyi Okowa.

Personal life 
Jacob Oboreh is married to Justina Oboreh who is a Management Scholar at the Delta State University, Abraka, and they are blessed with children.

References 

Living people
People from Delta State
Vice-Chancellors of Delta State University of Science and Technology, Ozoro
Year of birth missing (living people)